Norma Pimentel, MJ (born July 1, 1953) is a Mexican-American nun of the Missionaries of Jesus and the executive director of Catholic Charities of the Rio Grande Valley. She has been praised by Pope Francis and others for her work with refugees and immigrants to the United States. She has also gained international attention for her work and for speaking out against the Trump administration family separation policy.

In 2020, she was included on Times list of the 100 most influential people in the world.

Early life
Pimentel was born on July 1, 1953, in Brownsville, Texas, where her parents had applied for residency. Her mother was from Matamoros and her father was from Chiapas, both in Mexico.

She started kindergarten in Matamoros, Mexico, and then moved to Brownsville, Texas. She describes herself as an American citizen by chance, having grown up on both sides of the border. She has four siblings.

She was a poor student in high school but improved her grades enough to be admitted to college. She studied art, earning a bachelor's degree in the subject from the Pan American University. She made money as a young woman designing window displays for clothing stores.

Religious life

Pimentel entered religious life against the wishes of her family. She entered the Missionaries of Jesus in 1978. As part of her formation, she earned a master's degree in theology from St. Mary's University. She later earned a second master's in counseling at Loyola University Chicago.

She began working with refugees in 1980 at the Casa Oscar Romero and there developed a passion for the work. Pimentel became executive director of Catholic Charities of the Rio Grande Valley in 2004, having previously served as a counselor and assistant director. In this role she provides food, shelter, and other necessities to migrants entering the United States. She has been featured in newspapers around the world, on 20/20, CNN, 60 Minutes, and more.

Pimentel continues to paint, often portraying the refugee families she sees in her shelter. The paintings are often donated to fundraisers, and one was given as a gift to Pope Francis during his 2015 trip to the United States.

Pimentel was selected to receive the Laetare Medal by the University of Notre Dame in recognition of outstanding service to the Catholic Church and society in March 2018.

Notes

References

American people of Mexican descent
People from Matamoros, Tamaulipas
People from Brownsville, Texas
University of Texas–Pan American alumni
Loyola University Chicago alumni
Laetare Medal recipients
St. Mary's University, Texas alumni
American women painters
1953 births
Living people
20th-century American Roman Catholic nuns
21st-century American Roman Catholic nuns